The 2019 European Parliament election took place in Italy on 26 May 2019.

In Lombardy Lega Nord came first with 43.4% of the vote (country-level result 34.3%) and more than 20pp than the Democratic Party, which came second with 23.1%. The Five Star Movement came third with 9.3%, ahead of Forza Italia (8.7%), Brothers of Italy (5.5%), More Europe (3.1%), Green Europe (2.5%) and The Left (1.3%).

Results

References

Elections in Lombardy
European Parliament elections in Italy
2019 European Parliament election
2019 elections in Italy